The 2022 Jasmin Open Monastir was a WTA tournament organised for female professional tennis players on outdoord hard courts. The event took place at the Skanes Family Hotel in Monastir, Tunisia, from 3 through 9 October 2022.

The $251,750 subsidized tournament belonged to the WTA 250 tournament. The world number two Ons Jabeur from Tunisia became the highest seeded singles player. As the last direct participant in the singles game, the 90th ranked player Kamilla Rakhimova entered.

The Jasmin Open Monastir was added to the 40th week of the season in May 2022, however, it was one of the six tournaments that were given single-year WTA 250 licenses in September and October 2022 due to the cancellation of tournaments in China due to Peng Shuai sexual assault and disappearance controversy, who in November 2021 accused former Vice Premier Zhang Gaoli of sexual violence, and as well as the COVID-19 pandemic. As a result of Russian invasion of Ukraine at the end of February 2022, the ATP, WTA and ITF tennis governing bodies of the Grand Slams decided that Russian and Belarusian tennis players could continue to compete on the circuits, but not under the flags of Russia and Belarus until further notice.

Belgian Elise Mertens won her seventh singles title on the WTA Tour circuit. The doubles was dominated by the Czech Kateřina Siniaková and the French Kristina Mladenovic, who fulfilled the role of favorites and turned their first joint participation in doubles competitions into a trophy.

Champions

Singles

  Elise Mertens def.  Alizé Cornet, 6–2, 6–0

This is Mertens' first title of the year and seventh of her career.

Doubles

  Kristina Mladenovic /  Kateřina Siniaková def.  Miyu Kato /  Angela Kulikov, 6–2, 6–0

Singles main draw entrants

Seeds

 Rankings are as of September 26, 2022.

Other entrants
The following players received wildcards into the singles main draw:
  Mirra Andreeva
  Alizé Cornet
  Yasmine Mansouri

The following player received entry using a protected ranking into the singles main draw:
  Evgeniya Rodina

The following players received entry from the qualifying draw:
  Marina Bassols Ribera
  Linda Fruhvirtová
  Ana Konjuh
  Despina Papamichail
  Lucrezia Stefanini
  Moyuka Uchijima

The following player received entry as a lucky loser:
  Harmony Tan

Withdrawals
Before the tournament
  Sorana Cîrstea → replaced by  Kamilla Rakhimova
  Kaja Juvan → replaced by  Harmony Tan
  Jasmine Paolini → replaced by  Elena-Gabriela Ruse
  Clara Tauson → replaced by  Harriet Dart
  Martina Trevisan → replaced by  Laura Pigossi
  Alison Van Uytvanck → replaced by  Kateřina Siniaková

Retirements
  Chloé Paquet (back injury)
  Lucrezia Stefanini

Doubles main draw entrants

Seeds 

 1 Rankings as of September 26, 2022.

Other entrants 
The following pair received a wildcard into the doubles main draw:
  Inès Ibbou /  Yasmine Mansouri

Withdrawals 
 Before the tournament
  Kaitlyn Christian /  Han Xinyun → replaced by  Kaitlyn Christian /  Lidziya Marozava 
  Oksana Kalashnikova /  Katarzyna Piter → replaced by  Emily Appleton /  Quinn Gleason
  Lidziya Marozava /  Yana Sizikova → replaced by  Isabelle Haverlag /  Prarthana Thombare

 During the tournament
  Viktória Kužmová /  Elena-Gabriela Ruse
  Despina Papamichail /  Lucrezia Stefanini 
  Laura Pigossi /  Moyuka Uchijima

References

External links

2022 in tennis
Tennis tournaments in Tunisia
Jasmin Open
Jasmin Open